Brailovo is a village in the municipality of Dolneni, North Macedonia.

Demographics
In statistics gathered by Vasil Kanchov in 1900, the village of Brailovo was inhabited by 250 Christian Bulgarians and 100 Muslim Albanians. 

According to the 2021 census, the village had a total of 186 inhabitants. Ethnic groups in the village include:

Macedonians 183
Albanians 1
Serbs 1
Others 1

References

Villages in Dolneni Municipality